A jury is a body of persons convened to render a verdict in a legal situation.

Jury or juried  may also refer to:

People
 Al Jury, American football official
 Bob Jury (born 1955), American football player
 Chris Jury (born 1956), English actor, director and writer
 Eliahu I. Jury (born 1923), American engineer
 Ernie Jury, New Zealand lawn bowler
 Hugo Jury (1887-1945), Austrian Nazi

Places
 Jury, Moselle, France

Other uses
 Jury (TV series), a 1974 Canadian reality television miniseries
 Juried competition, a juried competition, usually of literary or artistic works, including films
 Jury rig, makeshift repairs with the tools on hand
 Jury tampering, illegally influencing the jury

See also 
 Jurat
 The Jury (disambiguation)